By-elections to the 7th Russian State Duma were held to fill vacancies in the State Duma between the 2016 election and the 2021 election.

According to article 97 of the Federal Law "On elections of deputies of the State Duma", by-elections are appointed on the second Sunday of September (single voting day), but not less than 85 days before the day of voting. This means that if a vacant seat occurs before a single voting day, but less than 85 days before it, the election will be scheduled for next year. Also, by-elections are not appointed and are not held if, as a result of these elections, a Deputy cannot be elected for a term of more than one year before the end of the constitutional term for which the State Duma was elected.

The first by-elections were held on 10 September 2017, in two constituencies. The last by-elections were held on 13 September 2020, in four constituencies.

Overview

10 September 2017

Kingisepp

The seat from the Kingisepp constituency became vacant after the resignation of the Deputy Sergey Naryshkin, 5 October 2016. Naryshkin resigned in order to take up the post of head of Russia's Foreign Intelligence Service.

Bryansk

The seat from the Bryansk constituency became vacant after the resignation of the Deputy Vladimir Zhutenkov, 10 June 2017.

9 September 2018

Saratov

On 17 June 2017, Deputy Oleg Grishchenko, who was elected from the Saratov constituency, died. A by-election will be held after the 2017 single voting day on 10 September 2017. A by-election must be scheduled for any Sunday within a year of the date the seat is officially vacated, and must be announced no later than 85 days before the next single day of voting. United Russia did not file a candidate in the Saratov constituency, in exchange CPRF did not participate in the simultaneous by-election in the Balashov constituency. On 9 September 2018 former Communist State Duma member Olga Alimova won the by-election with 45.35% of the vote.

Registered candidates
 Olga Alimova (CPRF), Vice Chairman of the Saratov Oblast Duma, former Member of the State Duma (2011-2016)
 Svetlana Berezina (A Just Russia), head of "Centre for Protection of Citizens' Rights" foundation office in Saratov
 Aleksandr Grishantsov (Communists of Russia), first secretary of Communists of Russia regional office
 Aleksandr Kargopolov (RPPSS), software engineer at Saratov Interregional Veterinary Laboratory
 Dmitry Pyanykh (LDPR), Member of the Saratov Oblast Duma
 Ksenia Sverdlova (Yabloko), head of communications at Fund for Support of Innovative Education

Declined
 Igor Morozov (United Russia), director of Saratov Oblast Basic Medical College (won the primaries but was not nominated)

Results

|-
! colspan=2 style="background-color:#E9E9E9;text-align:left;vertical-align:top;" |Candidate
! style="background-color:#E9E9E9;text-align:left;vertical-align:top;" |Party
! style="background-color:#E9E9E9;text-align:right;" |Votes
! style="background-color:#E9E9E9;text-align:right;" |%
|-
|style="background-color: " |
|align=left|Olga Alimova
|align=left|Communist Party
|35,400
|45.35%
|-
|style="background-color: " |
|align=left|Dmitry Pyanykh
|align=left|Liberal Democratic Party
|12,499
|16.01%
|-
|style="background-color: " |
|align=left|Svetlana Berezina
|align=left|A Just Russia
|10,101
|12.94%
|-
|style="background-color: " |
|align=left|Aleksandr Kargopolov
|align=left|Party of Pensioners
|7,934
|10.16%
|-
|style="background-color: " |
|align=left|Aleksandr Grishantsov
|align=left|Communists of Russia
|5,310		
|6.80%
|-
|style="background-color: " |
|align=left|Ksenia Sverdlova
|align=left|Yabloko
|4,110			
|5.27%
|-
| colspan="5" style="background-color:#E9E9E9;"|
|- style="font-weight:bold"
| colspan="3" style="text-align:left;" | Total
| 78,056
| 100%
|-
| colspan="5" style="background-color:#E9E9E9;"|
|- style="font-weight:bold"
| colspan="4" |Source:
|
|}

Zavolzhsky

On 3 October 2017, Vladimir Vasilyev, who was elected from the Zavolzhsky constituency was appointed Acting Head of Dagestan. The by-election was won by billionaire and deputy general director of missile production factory "Sapfir" Sergey Veremeenko.

Registered candidates
 Leonid Bulatov (LDPR), Member of the Tver City Duma, aide to State Duma member Anton Morozov
 Aleksandr Grishin (RPPSS), former Member of the Legislative Assembly of Tver Oblast (2002-2011)
 Ilya Kleymyonov (Communists of Russia), Member of Konakovsky District Assembly of Deputies, first secretary of CPCR regional committee
 Vadim Solovyov (CPRF), former Member of the State Duma (2007-2016)
 Sergey Veremeenko (United Russia), Member of the Legislative Assembly of Tver Oblast, first deputy general director of Scientific and Production Association "Sapfir"
 Sergey Yurovsky (A Just Russia), Member of the Tver City Duma

Failed to qualify
 Sergey Zhegunov (Independent), chairman of the Labour Party of Russia regional office

Results

|-
! colspan=2 style="background-color:#E9E9E9;text-align:left;vertical-align:top;" |Candidate
! style="background-color:#E9E9E9;text-align:left;vertical-align:top;" |Party
! style="background-color:#E9E9E9;text-align:right;" |Votes
! style="background-color:#E9E9E9;text-align:right;" |%
|-
|style="background-color: " |
|align=left|Sergey Veremeenko
|align=left|United Russia
|47,263
|36.21%
|-
|style="background-color: " |
|align=left|Vadim Solovyov
|align=left|Communist Party
|27,177
|20.82%
|-
|style="background-color: " |
|align=left|Leonid Bulatov
|align=left|Liberal Democratic Party
|15,706
|12.03%
|-
|style="background-color: " |
|align=left|Sergey Yurovsky
|align=left|A Just Russia
|13,521
|10.36%
|-
|style="background-color: " |
|align=left|Aleksandr Grishin
|align=left|Party of Pensioners
|11,620
|8.90%
|-
|style="background-color: " |
|align=left|Ilya Kleymyonov
|align=left|Communists of Russia
|9,301	
|7.13%
|-
| colspan="5" style="background-color:#E9E9E9;"|
|- style="font-weight:bold"
| colspan="3" style="text-align:left;" | Total
| 130,523
| 100%
|-
| colspan="5" style="background-color:#E9E9E9;"|
|- style="font-weight:bold"
| colspan="4" |Source:
|
|}

Balashov

On 6 October 2017, Mikhail Isayev, who was elected from the Balashov constituency, was elected Mayor of Saratov. CPRF declined to nominate a candidate in Balashov constituency, in exchange United Russia did not file a challenger to Olga Alimova in the Saratov constituency. On 9 September 2018 Yevgeny Primakov Jr., journalist and grandson of former Prime Minister Yevgeny Primakov, won the by-election.

Registered candidates
 Yelena Chervyakova (RPPSS), tennis coach at Sport School of Olympian Reserve "Olympian Racquets"
 Stanislav Denisenko (LDPR), Member of the Saratov Oblast Duma
 Ilya Kozlyakov (Yabloko), deputy director for organisation of NPO "Centre for Informatisation and Supplementary Educational Services"
 Yevgeny Primakov (United Russia), journalist, general director of NPO "Russian Humanitarian Mission"
 Yelena Shanina (Communists of Russia), pensioner
 Nadezhda Skvortsova (A Just Russia), Saratov City Duma staffer
 Sergey Slepchenko (Independent), individual entrepreneur

Withdrew
 Rafil Bakhteev (Independent), Member of the Council of Pugachyov, preschool teacher

Results

|-
! colspan=2 style="background-color:#E9E9E9;text-align:left;vertical-align:top;" |Candidate
! style="background-color:#E9E9E9;text-align:left;vertical-align:top;" |Party
! style="background-color:#E9E9E9;text-align:right;" |Votes
! style="background-color:#E9E9E9;text-align:right;" |%
|-
|style="background-color: " |
|align=left|Yevgeny Primakov
|align=left|United Russia
|104,227
|65.15%
|-
|style="background-color: " |
|align=left|Yelena Shanina
|align=left|Communists of Russia
|18,481
|11.55%
|-
|style="background-color: " |
|align=left|Stanislav Denisenko
|align=left|Liberal Democratic Party
|11,575
|7.24%
|-
|style="background-color: " |
|align=left|Nadezhda Skvortsova
|align=left|A Just Russia
|9,722
|6.08%
|-
|style="background-color: " |
|align=left|Yelena Chervyakova
|align=left|Party of Pensioners
|6,505
|4.07%
|-
|style="background-color: " |
|align=left|Ilya Kozlyakov
|align=left|Yabloko
|2,312
|1.45%
|-
|style="background-color: " |
|align=left|Sergey Slepchenko
|align=left|Independent
|1,590
|0.99%
|-
| colspan="5" style="background-color:#E9E9E9;"|
|- style="font-weight:bold"
| colspan="3" style="text-align:left;" | Total
| 159,985
| 100%
|-
| colspan="5" style="background-color:#E9E9E9;"|
|- style="font-weight:bold"
| colspan="4" |Source:
|
|}

Nizhny Novgorod

On 17 January 2018, Vladimir Panov, who was elected from the Nizhny Novgorod constituency was elected Mayor of Nizhny Novgorod. On 9 September 2018 Vice Governor Dmitry Svatkovsky was elected in the by-election.

Registered candidates
 Tatyana Grinevich (A Just Russia), chief aide to Legislative Assembly of Nizhny Novgorod Oblast member
 Aleksey Kruglov (LDPR), deputy director of LLP "AZS-Oktan"
 Oleg Rodin (Yabloko), chairman of the Yabloko regional office
 Nikolay Ryabov (CPRF), former Member of the State Duma (2007-2016)
 Dmitry Svatkovsky (United Russia), acting Vice Governor of Nizhny Novgorod Oblast, 2000 Olympian champion in modern pentathlon

Withdrew after registration
 Ilya Ulyanov (Communists of Russia), Member of the Supreme Council of the Republic of Khakassia

Failed to qualify
 Vadim Oreshin (Independent), retired Navy captain

Results

|-
! colspan=2 style="background-color:#E9E9E9;text-align:left;vertical-align:top;" |Candidate
! style="background-color:#E9E9E9;text-align:left;vertical-align:top;" |Party
! style="background-color:#E9E9E9;text-align:right;" |Votes
! style="background-color:#E9E9E9;text-align:right;" |%
|-
|style="background-color:"|
|align=left|Dmitry Svatkovsky
|align=left|United Russia
|
|47.34%
|-
|style="background-color:"|
|align=left|Nikolay Ryabov
|align=left|Communist Party
|
|22.32%
|-
|style="background:"| 
|align=left|Tatyana Grinevich
|align=left|A Just Russia
|
|10.78%
|-
|style="background-color:"|
|align=left|Aleksey Kruglov
|align=left|Liberal Democratic Party
|
|9.33%
|-
|style="background-color:"|
|align=left|Oleg Rodin
|align=left|Yabloko
|
|4.48%
|-
| colspan="5" style="background-color:#E9E9E9;"|
|- style="font-weight:bold"
| colspan="3" style="text-align:left;" | Total
| 
| 100%
|-
| colspan="5" style="background-color:#E9E9E9;"|
|- style="font-weight:bold"
| colspan="4" |Source:
|
|}

Central (Kaliningrad Oblast)

On 18 April 2018, Alexey Silanov, who was elected from the Central constituency of Kaliningrad Oblast was elected Mayor of Kaliningrad. On 9 September 2018 former Kaliningrad Mayor Aleksandr Yaroshuk won the by-election.

Registered candidates
 Konstantin Doroshok (A Just Russia), former Member of the Kaliningrad Oblast Duma (2011-2016)
 Olga Kuzemskaya (RPPSS), former acting Deputy Chairman of the Government of Kirov Oblast (2016-2017)
 Yevgeny Mishin (LDPR), Member of the Kaliningrad Oblast Duma
 Aleksandr Orlov (Communists of Russia), first secretary of CPCR regional office
 Igor Revin (CPRF), Member of the Kaliningrad Oblast Duma, former Member of the State Duma (2015-2016)
 Aleksandr Yaroshuk (United Russia), former Mayor of Kaliningrad (2012-2018)

Results

|-
! colspan=2 style="background-color:#E9E9E9;text-align:left;vertical-align:top;" |Candidate
! style="background-color:#E9E9E9;text-align:left;vertical-align:top;" |Party
! style="background-color:#E9E9E9;text-align:right;" |Votes
! style="background-color:#E9E9E9;text-align:right;" |%
|-
|style="background-color:"|
|align=left|Aleksandr Yaroshuk
|align=left|United Russia
|32,185
|39.87%
|-
| style="background-color: " |
|align=left|Igor Revin
|align=left|Communist Party
|18,206
|22.55%
|-
| style="background-color: " |
|align=left|Yevgeny Mishin
|align=left|Liberal Democratic Party
|11,023
|13.65%
|-
| style="background-color: " |
|align=left|Olga Kuzemskaya
|align=left|Party of Pensioners
|5,538
|6.86%
|-
| style="background-color: " |
|align=left|Konstantin Doroshok
|align=left|A Just Russia
|5,212
|6.46%
|-
| style="background-color: " |
|align=left|Aleksandr Orlov
|align=left|Communists of Russia
|4,408
|5.46%
|-
| colspan="5" style="background-color:#E9E9E9;" |
|- style="font-weight:bold"
| colspan="3" style="text-align:left;" |Total
|80,729
|100%
|-
| colspan="5" style="background-color:#E9E9E9;" |
|- style="font-weight:bold"
| colspan="4" |Source:
|
|}

Amur

On 14 June 2018, Ivan Abramov, who was elected from the Amur constituency resigned, due to selection to the Federation Council. United Russia did not field any candidate in the by-election. On 9 September 2018 Blagoveshchensk City Duma member Andrey Kuzmin won the by-election.

Registered candidates
 Gennady Gamza (Communists of Russia), former Member of the State Duma (1995-2003)
 Andrey Kuzmin (LDPR), Member of the Blagoveshchensk City Duma
 Galina Nikishina (RPPSS), former chief doctor at Fevralsk rail hospital
 Tatyana Rakutina (CPRF), former Member of the Legislative Assembly of Amur Oblast (2007-2011)
 Kirill Zimin (A Just Russia), Member of the Legislative Assembly of Amur Oblast

Failed to qualify
 Lyubov Radchenko (CPSS), deputy administrator of LLP "Managing Company Amurkurort"

Results

|-
! colspan=2 style="background-color:#E9E9E9;text-align:left;vertical-align:top;" |Candidate
! style="background-color:#E9E9E9;text-align:left;vertical-align:top;" |Party
! style="background-color:#E9E9E9;text-align:right;" |Votes
! style="background-color:#E9E9E9;text-align:right;" |%
|-
|style="background-color: " |
|align=left|Andrey Kuzmin
|align=left|Liberal Democratic Party
|61,301
|31.64%
|-
|style="background-color: " |
|align=left|Tatyana Rakutina
|align=left|Communist Party
|57,396
|29.62%
|-
|style="background-color: " |
|align=left|Kirill Zimin
|align=left|A Just Russia
|26,170
|13.51%
|-
|style="background-color: " |
|align=left|Gennady Gamza
|align=left|Communists of Russia
|20,556
|10.61%
|-
|style="background-color:" |
|align=left|Galina Nikishina
|align=left|Party of Pensioners
|16,676
|8.61%
|-
| colspan="5" style="background-color:#E9E9E9;" |
|- style="font-weight:bold"
| colspan="3" style="text-align:left;" |Total
|193,742
|100%
|-
| colspan="5" style="background-color:#E9E9E9;" |
|- style="font-weight:bold"
| colspan="4" |Source:
|
|}

Samara

On 14 June 2018, Nadezhda Kolesnikova, who was elected from the Samara constituency resigned because she was moving to another job. On 9 September 2018 former State Duma member Aleksandr Khinshtein won the by-election.

Registered candidates
 Mikhail Abdalkin (CPRF), technological facility operator at Novokuybyshevsk Oil Refinery
 Vadim Baykov (Communists of Russia), first secretary of CPCR regional office
 Aleksandr Gusev (A Just Russia), Member of the Duma of Novokuybyshevsk, director of Novokuybyshevsk Water Utilities
 Aleksandr Khinshtein (United Russia), counselor to Director of National Guard of Russia, former Member of the State Duma (2003-2016)
 Roman Sinelnikov (LDPR), Member of Council of Deputies of Krasnoglinsky District of Samara, aide to State Duma Vice Speaker Igor Lebedev
 Igor Yermolenko (Yabloko), head of Centre for Students' Creativity at Samara Medical-Technical Lyceum, chairman of Yabloko regional office

Failed to qualify
 Vladimir Avdonin (Parnas), student at Samara State Medical University

Results

|-
! colspan=2 style="background-color:#E9E9E9;text-align:left;vertical-align:top;" |Candidate
! style="background-color:#E9E9E9;text-align:left;vertical-align:top;" |Party
! style="background-color:#E9E9E9;text-align:right;" |Votes
! style="background-color:#E9E9E9;text-align:right;" |%
|-
| style="background-color: " |
|align=left|Aleksandr Khinshtein
|align=left|United Russia
|117,726
|56.98%
|-
| style="background-color: " |
|align=left|Mikhail Abdalkin
|align=left|Communist Party
|29,868
|14.46%
|-
| style="background-color: " |
|align=left|Vadim Baykov
|align=left|Communists of Russia
|15,288
|7.40%
|-
| style="background-color: " |
|align=left|Roman Sinelnikov
|align=left|Liberal Democratic Party
|13,318
|6.45%
|-
| style="background-color: " |
|align=left|Aleksandr Gusev
|align=left|A Just Russia
|12,478
|6.04%
|-
| style="background-color: " |
|align=left|Igor Yermolenko
|align=left|Yabloko
|6,758
|3.27%
|-
| colspan="5" style="background-color:#E9E9E9;" |
|- style="font-weight:bold"
| colspan="3" style="text-align:left;" |Total
|206,602
|100%
|-
| colspan="5" style="background-color:#E9E9E9;" |
|- style="font-weight:bold"
| colspan="4" |Source:
|
|}

8 September 2019

Novgorod

On 11 August 2018 Aleksandr Korovnikov, who was elected from the Novgorod constituency, died. Since the Deputy died a month before the single voting day, and to organize a by-election in this constituency on 9 September 2018 is too late, according to the law, the by-election will be held in 2019 single voting day (8 September 2019). On 8 September 2019 former Veliky Novgorod Mayor Yury Bobryshev won the by-election.

Registered candidates
 Yury Bobryshev (United Russia), Vice Chairman of the Government of Novgorod Oblast, former Mayor of Veliky Novgorod (2007-2018)
 Anna Cherepanova (Yabloko), Member of the Duma of Veliky Novgorod, chairwoman of the Yabloko regional office
 Aleksey Chursinov (LDPR), Vice Chairman of the Novgorod Oblast Duma
 Aleksandr Grishin (RPPSS), former Member of the Legislative Assembly of Tver Oblast (2002-2011)
 Dmitry Ignatov (A Just Russia), Member of the Novgorod Oblast Duma, general director of LLP "Jurist Consulting"
 Nina Ostanina (CPRF), former Member of the State Duma (1995-2011)
 Dmitry Perevyazkin (Communists of Russia), secretary of the Central Committee of CPCR
 Dmitry Tarasov (Party of Growth), general director of JSC "Managing Company Infrastructure Investments"
 Olga Yefimova (CPSS), dishwasher

Withdrew
 Ulyana Strizh (The Greens), reporter at LLP "Vashi Novosti"

Results

|-
! colspan=2 style="background-color:#E9E9E9;text-align:left;vertical-align:top;" |Candidate
! style="background-color:#E9E9E9;text-align:left;vertical-align:top;" |Party
! style="background-color:#E9E9E9;text-align:right;" |Votes
! style="background-color:#E9E9E9;text-align:right;" |%
|-
|style="background-color: " |
|align=left|Yury Bobryshev
|align=left|United Russia
|40,293
|35.39%
|-
|style="background-color: " |
|align=left|Nina Ostanina
|align=left|Communist Party
|23,154
|20.33%
|-
|style="background-color: " |
|align=left|Dmitry Ignatov
|align=left|A Just Russia
|14,745
|12.95%
|-
|style="background-color: " |
|align=left|Anna Cherepanova
|align=left|Yabloko
|9,153
|8.04%
|-
|style="background-color: " |
|align=left|Aleksey Chursinov
|align=left|Liberal Democratic Party
|7,366
|6.47%
|-
|style="background-color: #ff2e2e" |
|align=left|Olga Yefimova
|align=left|Communist Party of Social Justice
|6,144
|5.40%
|-
|style="background-color:" |
|align=left|Aleksandr Grishin
|align=left|Party of Pensioners
|3,621
|3.18%
|-
|style="background-color: " |
|align=left|Dmitry Perevyazkin
|align=left|Communists of Russia
|2,483
|2.18%
|-
|style="background-color: " |
|align=left|Dmitry Tarasov
|align=left|Party of Growth
|2,131
|1.87%
|-
| colspan="5" style="background-color:#E9E9E9;"|
|- style="font-weight:bold"
| colspan="3" style="text-align:left;" | Total
| 113,865
| 100%
|-
| colspan="5" style="background-color:#E9E9E9;"|
|- style="font-weight:bold"
| colspan="4" |Source:
|
|}

Komsomolsk

On 23 September 2018, Sergey Furgal who was elected from the Komsomolsk-na-Amure constituency, was elected Governor of Khabarovsk Krai. On 8 September 2019 Ivan Pilyaev won the by-election.

Registered candidates
 Oleg Kotov (Patriots of Russia), individual entrepreneur
 Andrey Petrov (The Greens), Deputy Head of the Department of Forest Management of Khabarovsk Krai
 Ivan Pilyaev (LDPR), aide to State Duma member Valery Seleznev, acting coordinator of LDPR regional office in Jewish Autonomous Oblast
 Nikolay Platoshkin (CPRF), head of the department of foreign relations and diplomacy at the Moscow University for the Humanities, chairman of the For a New Socialism movement
 Andrey Shvetsov (Party of Growth), deputy general director of Prima Media Holding
 Vladimir Titorenko (Communists of Russia), office manager at LLP "TSEPTER International"
 Viktoria Tsyganova (United Russia), singer and songwriter, actress at Triada Theatre
 Vladimir Vorobyev (Rodina), deputy general director of LLP "KargoGrupp"
 Tatyana Yaroslavtseva (A Just Russia), member of the Public Chamber of Khabarovsk Krai, former Member of the Khabarovsk Krai Council of People's Deputies (1990-1994)
 Nikolay Yevseenko (RPPSS), director of Khabarovsk Krai Drama Theatre

Results

|-
! colspan=2 style="background-color:#E9E9E9;text-align:left;vertical-align:top;" |Candidate
! style="background-color:#E9E9E9;text-align:left;vertical-align:top;" |Party
! style="background-color:#E9E9E9;text-align:right;" |Votes
! style="background-color:#E9E9E9;text-align:right;" |%
|-
|style="background-color: " |
|align=left|Ivan Pilyaev
|align=left|Liberal Democratic Party
|65,596
|39.12%
|-
|style="background-color: " |
|align=left|Nikolay Platoshkin
|align=left|Communist Party
|41,398
|24.69%
|-
|style="background-color: " |
|align=left|Viktoria Tsyganova
|align=left|United Russia
|17,901
|10.68%
|-
|style="background-color: " |
|align=left|Tatyana Yaroslavtseva
|align=left|A Just Russia
|7,887
|4.70%
|-
|style="background-color: " |
|align=left|Nikolay Yevseenko
|align=left|Party of Pensioners
|5,637
|3.36%
|-
|style="background: ;"| 
|align=left|Andrey Petrov
|align=left|The Greens
|5,167
|3.08%
|-
|style="background: #E62020;"| 
|align=left|Vladimir Titorenko
|align=left|Communists of Russia
|4,898
|2.92%
|-
|style="background-color: " |
|align=left|Vladimir Vorobyev
|align=left|Rodina
|3,420
|2.04%
|-
|style="background-color: " |
|align=left|Andrey Shvetsov
|align=left|Party of Growth
|3,020
|1.80%
|-
|style="background-color: " |
|align=left|Oleg Kotov
|align=left|Patriots of Russia
|2,989
|1.78%
|-
| colspan="5" style="background-color:#E9E9E9;"|
|- style="font-weight:bold"
| colspan="3" style="text-align:left;" | Total
| 167,685
| 100%
|-
| colspan="5" style="background-color:#E9E9E9;"|
|- style="font-weight:bold"
| colspan="4" |Source:
|
|}

Serov

On 12 December 2018, Sergey Bidonko who was elected from the Serov constituency, was appointed the Vice Governor of Sverdlovsk Oblast. On 8 September 2019 biathlete Anton Shipulin won the by-election.

Registered candidates
 Yevgenia Chudnovets (LDPR), activist, defendant in Chudnovets Case
 Gabbas Dautov (CPRF), Member of the Duma of Kachkanar
 Aleksey Korovkin (A Just Russia), paramedic at Novolyalinsky District Hospital
 Igor Ruzakov (The Greens), lawyer, chairman of The Greens regional office
 Anton Shipulin (United Russia), biathlete, 2014 Olympic champion (disqualified in 2020)
 Irina Skachkova (Yabloko), teacher
 Dmitry Zenov (Communists of Russia), acting first secretary of CPCR regional committee

Failed to qualify
 Sergey Kapchuk (Party of Growth), former Member of the Chamber of Representatives of the Legislative Assembly of Sverdlovsk Oblast (2000-2008), former Vice Governor of Sverdlovsk Oblast (1996-2000)

Results

|-
! colspan=2 style="background-color:#E9E9E9;text-align:left;vertical-align:top;" |Candidate
! style="background-color:#E9E9E9;text-align:left;vertical-align:top;" |Party
! style="background-color:#E9E9E9;text-align:right;" |Votes
! style="background-color:#E9E9E9;text-align:right;" |%
|-
|style="background-color: " |
|align=left|Anton Shipulin
|align=left|United Russia
|46,015
|41.59%
|-
|style="background-color: " |
|align=left|Aleksey Korovkin
|align=left|A Just Russia
|26,583
|24.03%
|-
|style="background-color: " |
|align=left|Gabbas Daudov
|align=left|Communist Party
|15,276
|13.81%
|-
|style="background-color: " |
|align=left|Yevgenia Chudnovets
|align=left|Liberal Democratic Party
|8,280
|7.48%
|-
|style="background-color: " |
|align=left|Irina Skachkova
|align=left|Yabloko
|3,999
|3.55%
|-
|style="background-color: " |
|align=left|Dmitry Zenov
|align=left|Communists of Russia
|3,700
|3.34%
|-
|style="background-color: " |
|align=left|Igor Ruzakov
|align=left|The Greens
|2,157
|1.95%
|-
| colspan="5" style="background-color:#E9E9E9;"|
|- style="font-weight:bold"
| colspan="3" style="text-align:left;" | Total
| 110,635
| 100%
|-
| colspan="5" style="background-color:#E9E9E9;"|
|- style="font-weight:bold"
| colspan="4" |Source:
|
|}

Oryol

On 5 April 2019, Nikolay Kovalyov who was elected from the Oryol constituency, died. On 8 September 2019 Oryol State University rector Olga Pilipenko won the by-election.

Registered candidates
 Valery Chudo (Yabloko), generał director of LLP "Yenich"
 Ivan Dynkovich (CPRF), Member of the Oryol City Council of People's Deputies, aide to State Duma member Nikolay Ivanov
 Sergey Kuznetsov (Rodina), general director of LLP "Spektrfarm"
 Roman Neverov (LDPR), coordinator of LDPR regional office
 Mikhail Orlov (Communists of Russia), acting first secretary of CPCR regional committee in Ulyanovsk Oblast
 Ruslan Perelygin (A Just Russia), Member of the Oryol Oblast Council of People's Deputies, chairman of A Just Russia regional office
 Olga Pilipenko (United Russia), Member of the Oryol Oblast Council of People's Deputies, rector of Oryol State University
 Oleg Timokhin (RPPSS), general director of JSC "Krasnaya Zvezda"

Failed to qualify
 Marina Prokofyeva (Independent), pensioner, community activist

Results

|-
! colspan=2 style="background-color:#E9E9E9;text-align:left;vertical-align:top;" |Candidate
! style="background-color:#E9E9E9;text-align:left;vertical-align:top;" |Party
! style="background-color:#E9E9E9;text-align:right;" |Votes
! style="background-color:#E9E9E9;text-align:right;" |%
|-
|style="background-color: " |
|align=left|Olga Pilipenko
|align=left|United Russia
|152,073
|53.62%
|-
|style="background-color: " |
|align=left|Ivan Dynkovich
|align=left|Communist Party
|45,303
|15.97%
|-
|style="background-color:" |
|align=left|Oleg Timokhin
|align=left|Party of Pensioners
|23,165
|8.17%
|-
|style="background-color: " |
|align=left|Ruslan Perelygin
|align=left|A Just Russia
|16,724
|5.90%
|-
|style="background-color: " |
|align=left|Roman Neverov
|align=left|Liberal Democratic Party
|12,929
|4.56%
|-
|style="background-color: " |
|align=left|Valery Chudo
|align=left|Yabloko
|10,169
|3.59%
|-
|style="background-color: " |
|align=left|Mikhail Orlov
|align=left|Communists of Russia
|9,909
|3.50%
|-
|style="background-color: " |
|align=left|Sergey Kuznetsov
|align=left|Rodina
|5,281
|1.86%
|-
| colspan="5" style="background-color:#E9E9E9;"|
|- style="font-weight:bold"
| colspan="3" style="text-align:left;" | Total
| 283,631
| 100%
|-
| colspan="5" style="background-color:#E9E9E9;"|
|- style="font-weight:bold"
| colspan="4" |Source:
|
|}

13 September 2020

Seimsky

On 20 June 2019, Viktor Karamyshev, who was elected from the Seimsky constituency was elected Mayor of Kursk. Since Karamyshev resigned only on 9 July, it was no longer possible to appoint by-election for a 2019 single voting day, because of this, the by-election will be held in 2020. On 13 September 2020 former Vice Governor Aleksey Zolotarev won the by-election.

Registered candidates
 Aleksey Bobovnikov (CPRF), Member of the Kursk City Assembly
 Anatoly Kurakin (A Just Russia), chief doctor at Vash Doktor clinic
 Aleksey Tomanov (LDPR), Member of the Kursk City Assembly, coordinator of LDPR regional office
 Artyom Vakarev (Communists of Russia), second secretary of CPCR regional committee
 Aleksey Zolotarev (United Russia), former Deputy Governor of Kursk Oblast (2012-2020)

Withdrew
 Aleksandr Fedulov (Independent), former Member of the State Duma (1999-2003)
 Yevgeny Pronichenko (Independent), assistant at the department of forensic medicine at Kursk State Medical University

Results

|-
! colspan=2 style="background-color:#E9E9E9;text-align:left;vertical-align:top;" |Candidate
! style="background-color:#E9E9E9;text-align:left;vertical-align:top;" |Party
! style="background-color:#E9E9E9;text-align:right;" |Votes
! style="background-color:#E9E9E9;text-align:right;" |%
|-
|style="background-color: " |
|align=left|Aleksey Zolotarev
|align=left|United Russia
|108,523
|60.08%
|-
|style="background-color: " |
|align=left|Aleksey Bobovnikov
|align=left|Communist Party
|25,650
|14.20%
|-
|style="background-color: " |
|align=left|Anatoly Kurakin
|align=left|A Just Russia
|15,727
|8.71%
|-
|style="background-color: " |
|align=left|Aleksey Tomanov
|align=left|Liberal Democratic Party
|14,508
|8.03%
|-
|style="background-color: " |
|align=left|Artyom Vakarev
|align=left|Communists of Russia
|11,388
|6.30%
|-
| colspan="5" style="background-color:#E9E9E9;"|
|- style="font-weight:bold"
| colspan="3" style="text-align:left;" | Total
| 180,626
| 100%
|-
| colspan="5" style="background-color:#E9E9E9;"|
|- style="font-weight:bold"
| colspan="4" |Source:
|
|}

Lermontovsky

On 22 January 2020, Leonid Levin, who was elected from the Lermontovsky constituency was appointed Deputy Chief of Staff of the Government. United Russia primary election was not held, as both filed candidates — general director of LLP "Khoroshee Delo" Sergey Novikov and cosmonaut Aleksandr Samokutyayev — withdrew their candidacies from the primaries. Samokutyayev eventually ran as A Just Russia candidate and won the by-election on 13 September 2020.

Registered candidates
 Fatima Khugaeva (Communists of Russia), MVD pensioner
 Kirill Metalnikov (Civic Platform), general director of LLP "Meridian"
 Aleksandr Samokutyayev (A Just Russia), cosmonaut
 Vadim Serdovintsev (LDPR), Member of the Assembly of Representatives of Nizhny Lomov, general director of LLP "Perunovo koleso"
 Aleksandr Trutnev (CPRF), Member of the Penza City Duma, commercial director of LLP TP "Snezhok"
 Yevgeny Vorozhtsov (RPPSS), lawyer

Results

|-
! colspan=2 style="background-color:#E9E9E9;text-align:left;vertical-align:top;" |Candidate
! style="background-color:#E9E9E9;text-align:left;vertical-align:top;" |Party
! style="background-color:#E9E9E9;text-align:right;" |Votes
! style="background-color:#E9E9E9;text-align:right;" |%
|-
|style="background-color: " |
|align=left|Aleksandr Samokutyayev
|align=left|A Just Russia
|162,004
|60.38%
|-
|style="background-color: " |
|align=left|Aleksandr Trutnev
|align=left|Communist Party
|34,925
|13.02%
|-
|style="background-color: " |
|align=left|Vadim Serdovintsev
|align=left|Liberal Democratic Party
|19,803
|7.38%
|-
|style="background-color:"|
|align=left|Yevgeny Vorozhtsov
|align=left|Party of Pensioners
|19,626
|7.32%
|-
|style="background-color: " |
|align=left|Fatima Khugaeva
|align=left|Communists of Russia
|11,118
|4.14%
|-
|style="background-color: " |
|align=left|Kirill Metalnikov
|align=left|Civic Platform
|10,957
|4.08%
|-
| colspan="5" style="background-color:#E9E9E9;"|
|- style="font-weight:bold"
| colspan="3" style="text-align:left;" | Total
| 268,286
| 100%
|-
| colspan="5" style="background-color:#E9E9E9;"|
|- style="font-weight:bold"
| colspan="4" |Source:
|
|}

Yaroslavl

On 23 January 2020, Aleksandr Gribov, who was elected from the Yaroslavl constituency was appointed Deputy Chief of Staff of the Government. On 13 September 2020 ice hockey player Andrey Kovalenko won the by-election.

Registered candidates
 Oleg Bulaev (CPSS), secretary of the Central Committee of CPSS, former Member of the Volgograd City Duma (2013-2018)
 Andrey Kovalenko (United Russia), Member of the Yaroslavl Oblast Duma, 1992 Olympic champion in ice hockey
 Yelena Kuznetsova (CPRF), Vice Chairman of the Yaroslavl Oblast Duma
 Anatoly Lisitsyn (A Just Russia), former Member of the Federation Council (2011-2018), former Member of the State Duma (2007-2011), former Governor of Yaroslavl Oblast (1991-2007)
 Irina Lobanova (LDPR), Member of the Yaroslavl Oblast Duma
 Oksana Romashkova (Communists of Russia), senior fellow at Russian Presidential Academy of National Economy and Public Administration
 Oleg Vinogradov (Yabloko), former Deputy Governor of Yaroslavl Oblast (2006-2009), chairman of Yabloko regional office
 Vladimir Vorozhtsov (RPPSS), former First Deputy Director of Federal Tax Police Service (2000-2002)

Failed to qualify
 Imamaddin Alasov (Independent), director of LLP "Sedmoe Nebo"
 Ilya Shesterikov (Independent), director of LLP "Gorodskaya Abonentskaya Sluzhba"

Results

|-
! colspan=2 style="background-color:#E9E9E9;text-align:left;vertical-align:top;" |Candidate
! style="background-color:#E9E9E9;text-align:left;vertical-align:top;" |Party
! style="background-color:#E9E9E9;text-align:right;" |Votes
! style="background-color:#E9E9E9;text-align:right;" |%
|-
|style="background-color: " |
|align=left|Andrey Kovalenko
|align=left|United Russia
|47,562
|40.27%
|-
|style="background-color: " |
|align=left|Anatoly Lisitsyn
|align=left|A Just Russia
|40,407
|34.21%
|-
|style="background-color: " |
|align=left|Yelena Kuznetsova
|align=left|Communist Party
|13,817
|11.70%
|-
|style="background-color: " |
|align=left|Oleg Vinogradov
|align=left|Yabloko
|4,578
|3.88%
|-
|style="background-color: " |
|align=left|Irina Lobanova
|align=left|Liberal Democratic Party
|4,049
|3.43%
|-
|style="background-color:" |
|align=left|Vladimir Vorozhtsov
|align=left|Party of Pensioners
|2,188
|1.85%
|-
|style="background-color: #ff2e2e" |
|align=left|Oleg Bulayev
|align=left|Communist Party of Social Justice
|1,380
|1.17%
|-
|style="background-color: " |
|align=left|Oksana Romashkova
|align=left|Communists of Russia
|1,356
|1.15%
|-
| colspan="5" style="background-color:#E9E9E9;"|
|- style="font-weight:bold"
| colspan="3" style="text-align:left;" | Total
| 118,108
| 100%
|-
| colspan="5" style="background-color:#E9E9E9;"|
|- style="font-weight:bold"
| colspan="4" |Source:
|
|}

Nizhnekamsk

On 7 February 2020, Airat Khairullin, who was elected from the Nizhnekamsk constituency died in a helicopter crash. On 13 September 2020 Senator of the Federation Council Oleg Morozov won the by-election.

Registered candidates
 Nikolay Barsukov (Communists of Russia), Member of the Kirov City Duma, first secretary of CPCR committee in Kirov Oblast
 Vasily Kolosov (LDPR), director "Planeta Talantov" foundation
 Oleg Morozov (United Russia), Senator of the Federation Council from Tatarstan, former Member of the State Duma (1994-2012)
 Ilnar Siraev (A Just Russia), Member of the Council of Turaevo in Mendeleyevsky District, general director of LLP "Neft-NK"
 Leonid Strazhnikov (CPSS), play zone administrator of LLP "Tatigra"
 Albert Yagudin (CPRF), Member of the Nizhnekamsk City Council, general director of CJSC "Nizhnekamsk Invest Holding"

Failed to qualify
 Vasily Korotkikh (Independent), database developer

Results

|-
! colspan=2 style="background-color:#E9E9E9;text-align:left;vertical-align:top;" |Candidate
! style="background-color:#E9E9E9;text-align:left;vertical-align:top;" |Party
! style="background-color:#E9E9E9;text-align:right;" |Votes
! style="background-color:#E9E9E9;text-align:right;" |%
|-
|style="background-color: " |
|align=left|Oleg Morozov
|align=left|United Russia
|279,450
|73.42%
|-
|style="background-color: " |
|align=left|Albert Yagudin
|align=left|Communist Party
|35,536
|9.34%
|-
|style="background-color: " |
|align=left|Ilnar Siraev
|align=left|A Just Russia
|26,001
|6.83%
|-
|style="background-color: " |
|align=left|Nikolay Barsukov
|align=left|Communists of Russia
|14,351
|3.77%
|-
|style="background-color: " |
|align=left|Andrey Kolosov
|align=left|Liberal Democratic Party
|14,149
|3.72%
|-
|style="background-color: #ff2e2e" |
|align=left|Leonid Strazhnikov
|align=left|Communist Party of Social Justice
|8,736
|2.30%
|-
| colspan="5" style="background-color:#E9E9E9;"|
|- style="font-weight:bold"
| colspan="3" style="text-align:left;" | Total
| 380,616
| 100%
|-
| colspan="5" style="background-color:#E9E9E9;"|
|- style="font-weight:bold"
| colspan="4" |Source:
|
|}

References 

 
2017 elections in Russia
2018 elections in Russia
 7
7th State Duma of the Russian Federation